Whyalla was an electoral district of the House of Assembly in the Australian state of South Australia from 1956 to 1993. The district was based on the town of Whyalla.

The district was abolished at the 1993 state election and replaced by Giles.

Members for Whyalla

Election results

References
Former Members of the Parliament of South Australia

External links
1985 & 1989 election boundaries, page 18 & 19

Former electoral districts of South Australia
1956 establishments in Australia
1993 disestablishments in Australia
Whyalla
Constituencies established in 1956
Constituencies disestablished in 1993